ESL One Cologne 2016, also known as ESL Cologne Major 2016 or Cologne 2016, was an Electronic Sports League Counter-Strike: Global Offensive tournament. It was the ninth Counter-Strike: Global Offensive Major Championship  and was held at the Lanxess Arena In Cologne, Germany from July 8–10. It featured 16 teams from throughout the world competing. Cologne 2016 had the second consecutive major with a prize pool of $1,000,000.

The playoffs featured eight teams. Astralis, Fnatic, Gambit Gaming, Natus Vincere, SK Gaming, Team Liquid, and Virtus.pro were returning Legends and FlipSid3 Tactics was the only new Legend. Ninjas in Pyjamas failed to retain its Legends status after eight straight majors of being Legends. The grand finals had SK Gaming, which was the defending champion from the previous major at MLG Major Championship: Columbus, against Team Liquid, which was the first ever North America team to reach the grand finals at a major. SK Gaming defeated FlipSid3 Tactics and Virtus.pro and Team Liquid upset Natus Vincere and Fnatic to reach the finals. In the end, SK Gaming defended its title 2–0 over the underdog Team Liquid and continued to be the only non-European team to win a title until the PGL 2017 Kraków Major Championship, in which Gambit Esports from Kazakhstan won the title. SK Gaming also joined Fnatic to be the only teams to have multiple major titles.

Format
The top eight teams from the MLG Columbus Major ("Legends") were automatically invited to ESL One Cologne 2016. The remaining eight spots were filled by teams that advanced from the ESL One Cologne 2016 Main Qualifier. These 16 teams were then split into four groups, seeded based on results from Columbus 2016 and the Cologne 2016 Main Qualifier. The groups were decided by a random number generator. First the bottom four teams of the qualifier – G2 Esports, Team EnVyUs, Team Dignitas, and FlipSid3 Tactics – were randomly assigned to groups as the fourth seeds. The top four teams of the qualifier – Gambit Gaming, OpTic Gaming, mousesports, and FaZe Clan – were then randomly selected to be the third seeds. The teams that placed fifth through eighth at Columbus 2016 – Fnatic, Virtus.pro, Counter Logic Gaming, and Ninjas in Pyjamas – were randomly assigned the second seeds in the group. Finally, the top four teams from Columbus 2016 – SK Gaming (formerly Luminosity Gaming), Natus Vincere, Astralis, and Team Liquid – were randomly given the top seeds in the four respective groups.

The way that ESL seeded the groups drew some criticism. While Groups A and B combined had three of HLTV's top-10 teams, Group D alone had SK Gaming (#1), G2 Esports (#2), Fnatic (#4), and FaZe (#16). CS:GO analysts called for a more effective seeding method.

All group matches were best-of-ones with the exception of the final decider match, deciding the last playoff spot. The highest seed would play the lowest seed in each group and the second and third seeds would play against each other. The winner of those two matches would play each other to determine which team moved on to the playoff stage, while the losers of the first round of matches also played. The loser of the lower match was then eliminated from the tournament. With one team advanced and one eliminated, the two remaining teams would play a best-of-three elimination match for the second playoff spot. This format is known as the GSL format, named for the Global StarCraft II League.

The playoffs bracket consisted of eight teams, two from each group. All of these matches were best-of-three, single elimination. Teams advanced in the bracket until a winner was decided.

Map Pool
There were seven maps to choose from. Between Columbus 2016 and Cologne 2016, Inferno was taken out of the active map pool and Nuke was reintroduced after the CSGO development team revamped the map. Before each best-of-one match in the group stage, teams alternated banning maps until five maps had been banned. One of the two remaining maps was randomly selected, and the team that that did not get a third ban then selected which side it wanted to start on. In all best-of-three series, each team first banned a map, leaving a five-map pool. Each team then chose a map, with the opposing team selecting which side they wanted to start on for their opponent's map choice. The two map picks were the first two maps in the best-of-three. If the series were to require a third map, the map was randomly selected from the three remaining maps.

Main Qualifier

Regional Qualifiers
The final four bracket from each qualifier are shown below; two from each move on to the main qualifying event. All games are offline.

Asia Minor
The winner and runner-up of Intel Extreme Masters Season X Taipei were invited to the qualifier. In addition, two teams from the Korean qualifier, two teams from the Chinese qualifier, one team from the Southeast Asia qualifier, and one team from the Oceania qualifier will be in the minor.

Europe Minor
The Europe Minor was held by DreamHack in Tours, France. Two qualifiers were held and four teams from each qualifier moved on to the minor.

CIS Minor
In the CIS Minor, four teams were invited and four more teams from the closed qualifier arrived to the minor in Moscow.

Americas Minor
The Americas Minor had four teams invited, three teams from the North American qualifier, and one team from the South American qualifier.

Main Qualifier
Like the previous majors, there will be a major qualifier and regional qualifiers. The bottom eight teams from MLG Columbus 2016 received automatic bids to the main qualifier. Two teams each from the Asia, North America, Europe, and CIS Minors will be able to compete in the major qualifier.

Unlike previous qualifiers, this main qualifier will be a sixteen team swiss tournament, where after the Day 1 games, teams will play other teams with the same win–loss record. Every round will consist of one game. In addition, teams will not play the same team twice. Any team with three wins would qualify for the major, and any team with three losses would be eliminated.

First round seeding was determined by the following:
 Teams that placed 9th at the previous major (mousesports, FaZe Clan, Gambit Gaming, G2 Esports) were first seeds
 Teams that placed 13th place at the previous major (FlipSid3 Tactics, Splyce, Team EnVyUs, Cloud9) were second seeds
 Teams that placed first in their regional qualifiers (OpTic Gaming, TyLoo, FLuffy Gangsters, Team Dignitas) were third seeds
 Teams that were runners-up in their regional qualifiers (Immortals, Renegades, Team Empire, HellRaisers) were fourth seeds

In the second round, the winners in the first round will face each other in the "high" matches; the losers will face each other in the "low" matches.

In the third round, the winners of the high matches from round two will face each other. The winners of these two matches will qualify for the major. The losers of the high round and the winners of the low round will face each other in the "mid" matches. The losers from the previous low matches will face each other in round three's low matches. The losers of these low matches are eliminated. Twelve teams remain in the Qualifier.

In the fourth round, the losers of the high matches and the winners of the low matches will face each other in round four's high matches. The winners of the high matches qualify for the major. The losers of the mid matches and the winners of the low matches will face each other in the low matches of round four. The losers of these matches are eliminated from the Qualifier. Six teams remain.

In the last round, the remaining teams will face off. The winners of these matches will qualify for the major and the losing teams will be eliminated.

Qualifier results

Broadcast talent
Stage Hosts
 Paul "ReDeYe" Chaloner
 Alex "Machine" Richardson
 Mitch "Uber" Leslie

Analysts
 Duncan "Thorin" Shields
 Jason "moses" O'Toole
 Janko "YNk" Paunović

Commentators
 Anders Blume
 Auguste "Semmler" Massonnat
 Henry "HenryG" Greer
 Matthew "Sadokist" Trivett
 Daniel "ddk" Kapadia
 James Bardolph
 Lauren "Pansy" Scott
 John "BLU" Mullen

Broadcasts
All streams were broadcast on Twitch in various languages.

Teams

Pre-Major ranking
The HLTV.org July 4, 2016 ranking, the final one released before ESL One Cologne 2016, is displayed below.

†Change since June 27, 2016 ranking

Group stage

The four groups were announced on ESL's social media accounts on June 12, 2016.

Group A

Group B

Group C

Group D

Also known as the "Group of Death," Group D featured four world class teams in one group, including the top three teams in the world. The matchup of the number 1, number 2, and number 3 teams all in the same group received criticism when a team of a lesser caliber such as Gambit could make it to the playoffs and a top three team would not. CS:GO analyst Duncan "Thorin" Shields called it the hardest group of all time.

Playoffs

Bracket

Quarterfinals

Virtus.pro vs. Astralis

Casters: moses & Pansy

SK Gaming vs FlipSid3 Tactics

Casters: James Bardolph & ddk

Natus Vincere vs Team Liquid

Casters: Sadokist & HenryG

Gambit Gaming vs Fnatic

Casters: Anders Blume & Semmler

Semifinals

Virtus.pro vs SK Gaming

Casters: Sadokist & HenryG

Team Liquid vs. Fnatic

Casters: James Bardolph & ddk

Finals

Casters: Anders Blume, Semmler, & moses

Final standings

Post-Major Ranking
The HLTV.org July 11, 2016 rankings of teams in the major is displayed below. The ranking was the first one released after the ESL One Cologne 2016.

†Change since July 4, 2016 ranking

References

Counter-Strike: Global Offensive Majors
2016 in esports
History of Cologne
2016 in German sport
ESL One Counter-Strike competitions